Athletics competitions at the 1997 Bolivarian Games were held at the Estadio Monumental Vírgen de Chapi in Arequipa, Perú, between October 17–26, 1997.

Gold medal winners from Ecuador were published by the Comité Olímpico Ecuatoriano.

A total of 45 events were contested, 23 by men and 22 by women.

Medal summary

Medal winners were published.

All results are marked as "affected by altitude" (A), because Arequipa is located at 2,335 m above sea level.

Men

Women

Medal table (unofficial)

References

Athletics at the Bolivarian Games
Perú
Bolivarian Games
Perú
1997 Bolivarian Games